Zygographa is a genus of moths of the family Yponomeutidae.

Species
Zygographa asaphochalca - Meyrick, 1917 

Yponomeutidae